The 1909 Calgary municipal election took place on December 13, 1909 to elect a Mayor and twelve Aldermen to sit on the twenty-sixth Calgary City Council from January 3, 1910 to January 2, 1911.

Mayor Reuben Rupert Jamieson was acclaimed upon the close of nominations on December 6, 1909.

Background
The election was held under multiple non-transferable vote where each elector was able to cast a ballot for the mayor and up to three ballots for separate councillors with a voter's designated ward.

Results

Mayor
 Reuben Rupert Jamieson – Acclaimed

Commissioner

Councillors

Ward 1

Ward 2
 James Smalley
 William Henry Ross

Ward 3

Ward 4

School Boards

Public School Board
James Walker - acclaimed
Herbert Arthur Sinnott - acclaimed

Separate School Board
P. Burns - acclaimed
E.H. Rouleau - acclaimed
John Kenny - acclaimed

Plebiscite
A bylaw providing that the legislature be requested to give the ratepayers an opportunity of voting on a question of adopting a commission form of government.

For – 1,182
Against – 367

See also
List of Calgary municipal elections

References

Municipal elections in Calgary
1909 elections in Canada
1900s in Calgary